Psilocerea arabica is a species of moth of the family Geometridae. It is found in Saudi Arabia, Yemen and Ethiopia.

References
Wiltshire, 1983. Insects of Saudi Arabia, Lepidoptera: Fam. Cossidae, Sphingidae, Thyretidae, Geoemtridae, Lymantriidae, Arctiidae, Agaristidae, Noctuidae (Part 3). - Fauna of Saudi Arabia 5:293–332.

Ennominae
Moths described in 1983